Stacy Dewayne Andrews (born June 2, 1981) is a former American football offensive tackle. He was drafted by the Cincinnati Bengals in the fourth round of the 2004 NFL Draft. He played college football at Ole Miss.

Andrews has also played for the Philadelphia Eagles and Seattle Seahawks. He is the older brother of offensive lineman Shawn Andrews.

Early years
Andrews attended Camden Fairview High School.

College career
While at Ole Miss, Andrews competed for the Rebels track and field team as a thrower. He never competed in football until his senior year at the University of Mississippi. He was drafted in the 2004 NFL Draft by the Cincinnati Bengals.

Professional career

Cincinnati Bengals
Andrews was drafted by the Cincinnati Bengals in the fourth round (123rd overall) in the 2004 NFL Draft. He played in every game during the 2006 and 2007 seasons.  During the 2007 season, Andrews started three games at left guard before starting the final eleven games of the season at right tackle, filling in for injured starter Willie Anderson. Because of his versatility and effectiveness, the Bengals placed the franchise tag on Andrews on February 18, 2008, despite the fact that Andrews did not officially have a starting job on the Bengals line. Andrews signed his one-year, $7.455 million tender on March 19. He tore his right anterior cruciate ligament in week 16 against the Cleveland Browns.

Philadelphia Eagles
Andrews signed a six-year contract with the Philadelphia Eagles on February 27, 2009. The move united him with his brother, Shawn Andrews, who was an offensive lineman for the Eagles at the time. The Andrews brothers did not play together, however, because Shawn Andrews was injured throughout the entire season, and was eventually released on March 17, 2010.

In week 2 of the 2009 season, Stacy Andrews was benched in favor of Max Jean-Gilles due to his knee injury from the previous season and his need for more practice with offensive line coach Juan Castillo on his pass-blocking.

In March 2010, Andrews agreed to restructure his contract, reducing his base salary.

Seattle Seahawks
Andrews was traded to the Seattle Seahawks in exchange for an undisclosed 2011 draft pick on September 4, 2010. He was released by the Seahawks on July 28, 2011, after one season in Seattle.

New York Giants
On August 3, 2011, Andrews signed with the New York Giants.  In week 13 of the 2011 NFL season, he did not play against the Green Bay Packers after he was hospitalized for pulmonary embolisms in both lungs. He became a free agent after the season.

References

External links
New York Giants bio

1981 births
Living people
People from Camden, Arkansas
Players of American football from Arkansas
American football offensive guards
American football offensive tackles
Ole Miss Rebels football players
Cincinnati Bengals players
Philadelphia Eagles players
Seattle Seahawks players
New York Giants players